Oisín O'Rorke (born 1994) is an Irish hurler who plays for Dublin Senior Championship club Kilmacud Crokes and at inter-county level with the Dublin senior hurling team He usually lines out as a right corner-forward.

Career statistics

Honours

Kilmacud Crokes
Dublin Senior Hurling Championship (2): 2012, 2014

Dublin
Leinster Minor Hurling Championship (2): 2011, 2012

References

External links
Oisín O'Rorke profile at the Dublin GAA website

1994 births
Living people
Kilmacud Crokes hurlers
UCD hurlers
Dublin inter-county hurlers